Bernard Blondeau (born 28 May 1944) is a French sports shooter. He competed in the mixed trap event at the 1976 Summer Olympics.

References

External links
 

1944 births
Living people
French male sport shooters
Olympic shooters of France
Shooters at the 1976 Summer Olympics
Place of birth missing (living people)
20th-century French people